Ostkustleden (in English: East Coast Trail) is a 99-mile (160 km) long hiking trail in the south-east of Sweden. The trail extends within the borders of Oskarshamn municipality. Ostkustleden was created between 1970-1977 by the environmental nonprofit organization Döderhults naturskyddsförening (the Döderhult´s Society for the Conservation of Nature). The trail starts six miles outside Oskarshamn at Lilla Hycklinge. Along the trail there are cabins which can be rented for accommodation.

Trail Sections 
Ostkustleden comprises eight sections of trail.

 Section 1: Lilla Hycklinge - Nynäs (10.6 mi, 17 km)
 Section 2: Nynäs – Lönhult (13.4 mi, 21.5 km)
 Section 3: Lönhult – Krokstorp (13 mi, 21 km)
 Section 4: Krokstorp - Mörtfors (10.9 mi, 17.5 km)
 Section 5: Mörtfors - Stjärneberg (11.5 mi, 18.5 km)
 Section 6: Stjärneberg - Lilla Laxemar (11.5 mi, 18.5 km)
 Section 7: Lilla Laxemar - Hällveberg (13 mi, 21 km)
 Section 8: Hedvigsberg - Lilla Hycklinge (11.2 mi, 18 km)

References 

 Ostkustleden - Information in English (se word-file link)
 Map Ostkustleden

Tourist attractions in Kalmar County
Hiking trails in Sweden